Ernest Alfred Newton (1868–1945) was Archdeacon of the Seychelles from 1912 to 1917.

Newton was educated at King's College, Cambridge and Wells Theological College; and ordained in 1893. After curacies in Aylesbury  and Cookham he was Rector at St Paul, Darjeeling then Civil Chaplain at Mahé, Seychelles before his time as Archdeacon.

References

1868 births
1945 deaths
19th-century English Anglican priests
20th-century English Anglican priests
Alumni of King's College, Cambridge
Alumni of Wells Theological College
Archdeacons of the Seychelles